Wheels Within Wheels is a novel by F. Paul Wilson published in 1978.

Plot summary
Wheels Within Wheels is a novel set in the interstellar society called the La Nague Federation.

Reception
Greg Costikyan reviewed Wheels Within Wheels in Ares Magazine #2 and commented that "the author's politics do not dominate the novel – non-libertarians can safely read it without danger to their mental equilibrium."

Kirkus Reviews states "A so-so effort, loosely linked to Wilson's Healer (1976); future volumes will apparently pull together the disparate threads."

The novel won the first Prometheus Award.

Reviews
Review by Dennis M. Maloney (1979) in Science Fiction & Fantasy Book Review, December 1979
Review by David Pettus (1980) in Fan Plus, #1 January 1980
Review by Dave Langford (1980) in Vector 97
Kliatt

References

1978 American novels
1978 science fiction novels
American science fiction novels
Doubleday (publisher) books